The Meaning of the Glorious Koran (1930) is an English Language translation of the Quran with brief introductions to the Surahs by Marmaduke Pickthall. In 1928, Pickthall took a two-year sabbatical to complete his translation of the meaning of the Quran, a work that he considered the summit of his achievement. Pickthall noted the impossibility of perfectly translating the Arabic into English, and he titled his work The Meaning of the Glorious Koran (A. A. Knopf, New York 1930). It was the first translation by a Muslim whose native language was English, and remains among the two most popular translations, the other being the work of Abdullah Yusuf Ali.

Editions
Everyman's Library (1993), 
Amana Publications; 1st ed edition (1996), 
Tahrike Tarsile Qur'an; 2nd edition (1999), 
The Meaning of the Glorious Qur'an; New Modern English Edition with brief explanatory notes and Index of subjects; 7th Edition (2011), Published by IDCI, available at: www.idci.co.uk

References

External links
 The Meaning of The Glorious Koran; An Explanatory Translation, Alfred A. Knopf, New York, First Edition (1930).
Quran Explorer Online Quran software with default set to Pickthall's translation and audio in English.
Al-Quran project includes the Quran translation, "The Meaning of the Glorious Koran", by Marmaduke Pickthall.
 project includes the Quran translation, "The Meaning of the Glorious Koran", by Marmaduke Pickthall.

English translations of the Quran
1930 books